Merestone, also known as the John S. Reese, IV, House, is a historic estate located in New Garden Township, Chester County, Pennsylvania, and New Castle County, Delaware, spanning the border of the two states. The estate consists of the Merestone House, guest house / garage, milk house, and stone shed.

It was renovated and added to by architect R. Brognard Okie in the Colonial Revival style. The original log section of Merestone House dates to between about 1720 and 1734.  It is a two-story, three bay, structure measuring 20 feet by 24 feet.  A two-story, two bay, frame addition was built between 1725 and 1750 and measures 19 feet by 18 feet.  A two-story, one bay, wing was added between about 1802 and 1806.  The house was renovated in the Colonial Revival style in 1941–1942.  At the same time, Okie built the -story, three bay, frame guest house / garage on the stone foundations of a barn dated to 1806.

It was added to the National Register of Historic Places in 1995.

References

Houses on the National Register of Historic Places in Delaware
Houses on the National Register of Historic Places in Pennsylvania
Colonial Revival architecture in Delaware
Colonial Revival architecture in Pennsylvania
Houses completed in 1942
Houses in Chester County, Pennsylvania
New Castle, Delaware
1942 establishments in Pennsylvania
National Register of Historic Places in New Castle County, Delaware